WINDS (Wideband InterNetworking engineering test and Demonstration Satellite, also known as Kizuna), was a Japanese communication satellite. Launch was originally scheduled for 2007. The launch date was eventually set for 15 February 2008, but a problem detected in a second stage maneuvering thruster delayed it to 23 February. Lift-off occurred at 08:55 GMT on 23 February from Tanegashima Space Center, and the satellite separated from its H-IIA carrier rocket into a Geosynchronous transfer orbit at 09:23. WINDS was used to relay the internet to Japanese homes and businesses through Ka-Band signals. It also tested technologies that would be utilised by future Japanese communication satellites. A part of Japan's i-Space program, WINDS was operated by JAXA and NICT.

Prior to launch, a JAXA brochure claimed that WINDS will be able to provide 155 Mbit/s download speeds to home users with 45-centimetre diameter satellite dishes, while providing industrial users via 5-metre diameter dishes with 1.2 Gbit/s speeds.

WINDS had a launch mass of 4,850 kg, reducing to a mass of around 2,750 kg after thrusting to its operational orbit. The spacecraft is 8 m x 3 m x 2 m in size, and its solar panels have a span of 21.5 metres. It has three-axis stabilisation, and a design life expectancy of five years.

The satellite became inoperable due to communications failure on 9 February 2019, and it was decommissioned by the transmission of a deactivation command at 06:54 GMT on 27 February 2019.

See also 
H-IIA
JAXA
Satellite Internet access

References

External links 
JAXA website about WINDS
LIVE COVERAGE: H-IIA KIZUNA (WINDS) Launch (updated 1:20 GMT) 1:20 GMT (8:20 pm EST): T-6 hours. Fueling of the H-IIA has commenced

Satellites of Japan
Spacecraft launched in 2008
2008 in Japan
Spacecraft launched by H-II rockets
Communications satellites in geostationary orbit